The 1952–53 La Liga was the 22nd season since its establishment. Barcelona retained the title and achieved their sixth trophy.

Team locations

League table

Results

Relegation group

Standings

Results

Top scorers

External links
 
Official LFP Site 

1952 1953
1952–53 in Spanish football leagues
Spain